Hongkongers in the Netherlands are people in the Netherlands originated from Hong Kong or having at least once such parent. 

According to OECD figures there are 9,935 people in the Netherlands migrated from Hong Kong, a figure which would exclude people who declared other sources of origin and people born in the Netherlands to Hong Kong parents. 

, figures from the Netherlands' Centraal Bureau voor de Statistiek showed that 9,757 Hong Kong-born persons (4,808 men, 4,949 women), and 8,440 persons with at least one parent born in Hong Kong (4,300 men, 4,140 women). 

The number of persons of Hong Kong background has shown only mild growth, entirely due to natural increase rather than additional migration; in fact the stock of Hong Kong migrants fell by 5.6% during the same period. 

According to F. N. Pieke, Hong Kong was a significant source of ethnic Chinese migrants to the Netherlands in the late 1970s and early 1980s, with about 600 to 800 per year, falling off to around 300 to 400 per year by the late 1980s.

While most Hongkongers are Cantonese by descent, there are Hongkongers who are of Teochew, Hakka, Shanghainese, Hokkien or South Asian descent, and people from overseas Chinese communities in Southeast Asia. Owing to Hong Kong's previous status as a British crown colony, the British nationality of the inhabitants and the existence of people with non-Chinese ancestry, Hongkongers overseas may or may not identify with the Chinese diaspora in the same country. 

One of the sources of Hongkongers in the Netherlands are Chinese Indonesians who first migrated to Hong Kong and moved onwards to the Netherlands with their children.

Notable people
Alex Cheung (张文山), Martial Artist and actor
, lyricist and writer
Popo Fan, owner and chef of Asian Glories
 (Nguyễn Nhi), actress
 Tahith Chong

References

 

Asian diaspora in the Netherlands
Dutch people of Asian descent
Ethnic groups in the Netherlands
Netherlands
Immigration to the Netherlands